Homer Bezaleel Hulbert (January 26, 1863 – August 5, 1949) was an American missionary, journalist, and political activist who advocated for the independence of Korea.

Biography
Hulbert was born in New Haven, Vermont, in 1863 to Calvin and Mary Hulbert. His mother, Mary Elizabeth Woodward Hulbert, was a granddaughter of Mary Wheelock, daughter of Eleazar Wheelock, the founder of Dartmouth College. After graduating from St. Johnsbury Academy and Dartmouth College, Hulbert attended Union Theological Seminary in 1884. He originally visited Korea in 1886 with two other instructors, Delzell A. Bunker and George W. Gilmore, to teach English at the Royal English School. In 1901 he founded the magazine The Korea Review. Before 1905, his attitude towards Japanese involvement in Korea was positive, as he saw the Japanese as agents of reform, in contrast to Russia, which he saw as reactionary. He changed his position in September 1905, when he criticized Japanese plans to turn the Korean Empire into a protectorate.

He resigned his position as a teacher in a public middle school, and in October 1905, he went to the United States as an emissary of Emperor Gojong to protest Japan's actions. After returning to the Korean Empire in 1906, he was sent as part of a secret delegation from Gojong to the Second International Peace Conference in The Hague in June 1907. The Korean delegation failed to gain a hearing with other world powers, and the Japanese used Gonjong's actions as a pretext to force him to abdicate.

Hulbert's 1906 book, The Passing of Korea, criticized Japanese rule. He was not so much theoretically opposed to colonialism as he was concerned that modernization under the secular Japanese was inferior to a Christian-inspired modernization. He was expelled by the Japanese resident-general for Korea on May 8, 1907.

Legacy
Hulbert contributed to the advancement of hangeul with his research and study into the orthography and the grammar of Hangul with Ju Si-gyeong. He also made the first hangeul (Korean) textbook Sămin p'ilji 사민필지 ("Essential Knowledge for Scholars and Commoners").

He was reported to have been a close personal friend of Gojong.

Syngman Rhee, one of his middle school students, became the first President of Korea and invited Hulbert back to Korea in 1948. It was on that trip that Hulbert developed pneumonia and died. Hulbert's tombstone reads, "I would rather be buried in Korea than in Westminster Abbey." He is interred at Yanghwajin Foreigners' Cemetery in Seoul. He was the recipient of the Order of Merit for National Foundation by the Korean government. He is referred to in the Republic of Korea as a 독립유공자 (contributor to independence). A statue of Hulbert was established in his honor, the only such statue dedicated to an American civilian in Seoul.

Anthropology
Homer Hulbert said that Korea and Japan have the same two racial types, but Japan is mostly Malay and Korea is mostly Manchu-Korean. Hulbert said that Korea is physically mostly of the northern type but also said that the nation, being physically mostly of the northern type, did not disprove Hulbert's claim that the Malay element developed Korea's first civilization although it was not necessarily originating Korea's first civilization, and the Malay element imposed its language in its main features in the entire peninsula. Hulbert said that in Korea there was a genetic admixture with Chinese blood that stopped more than 1000 years ago.

Selected bibliography
 1892 The Korean Repository (He was the editor of this monthly magazine)
 1889 Knowledge Necessary for All
 1903 Sign of the Jumna
 1903 Search for a Siberian Klondike
 1905 The History of Korea
 1905 Comparative Grammar of Korean and Dravidian
 1906 The Passing of Korea
 1907 The Japanese in Korea: Extracts from the Korea Review
 1925 Omjee - The Wizard
 1926 The Face in the Mist

See also
 Royal English School (육영공원 Korean Wikipedia)

References
Homer Hulbert Biography.  Royal Asiatic Society-Korea Branch
Homer Hulbert Biography | Royal Asiatic Society-Korea Branch

External links

 The Hulbert Memorial Society
 
 
[Arirang TV] History Trivia(Ep.13) Homer Hulbert(호머 헐버트)

1863 births
1949 deaths
American Protestant missionaries
Protestant missionaries in Korea
Korean independence activists
Recipients of the Order of Merit for National Foundation
People from New Haven, Vermont
American expatriates in Korea
Paleolinguists
Missionary linguists